is a Japanese manga series written and illustrated by Tobira Oda. An anime adaptation was announced in January 2013 and ran between April 2013 and February 2015.

Plot
Danchi Tomoo stars elementary school student Tomoo Kinoshita who lives in the mammoth Edajima Apartment Complex in Building #29 with his mother Tetsuko and sister Kimiko, while his father Tetsuo lives in an apartment in the city. While full of surreal gags, Danchi Tomoo also shows the real emotions of the Kinoshita family and their friends, neighbors, and classmates.

Characters

Kinoshita family
 
A fourth-grade student who excels at sports but not at his studies, and always seems to get in trouble. However, he longs to be responsible and often surprises those around him when he displays his big-hearted personality.
 
Tomoo and Kimiko's mother. She works part time at the neighborhood supermarket to make ends meet. She claims she once was as beautiful as her daughter, but in her middle age she has gained a significant amount of weight and often tries new exercise equipment to lose it.
 
Tomoo and Kimiko's father. He does not live with his wife and children, but instead in a bachelor's apartment in nearby Egi Town for work. Despite living apart, Tomoo dearly loves his father, and he loves his family by putting a photo of them above where he sleeps. Neither the reader of the manga nor the viewer of the anime ever get to see Tetsuo's face.
 
Tomoo's older sister who is in her second year of middle school. She is part of her school's biology club and longs to have her own bedroom. At one point she begins a journal trade with another person, unaware that it is actually Tomoo's friend Mitsuo.
 
Tetsuo's father who lives in nearby Edajima Town. He is particularly good at making mochi and whenever he tries to give advice, he thinks of what his wife used to say.
 
Tetsuo's mother who died before the series began. Whenever Grandpa wants to give advice, he remembers what Grandma told him.

Tomoo's friends, classmates, and neighbors
 
Tomoo's classmate and neighbor in Building #24. He is an honor student who also wants to try his hand at cooking.
 
Tomoo's classmate and neighbor in Building #20. He is also a poor student like Tomoo, and he secretly longs for his neighbor Tomoko.
 
Tomoo's classmate and neighbor in Building #3. He and Tomoo do not get along very well because of his bookish nature and also enjoys astronomy. He begins a journal trading with Kimiko, who is unaware that she is sharing her secrets with one of Tomoo's classmates.
 
Tomoo's classmate and neighbor in Building #31. She is a tomboy, and often has to playfully fight the boys to get them to stop acting badly. She has a straightforward personality and obsessed with food.
Keiko's mother 
She often dotes on her daughter, but does punish her when Keiko accidentally ruins one of Sakagami's books.
 
Tomoo's classmate and neighbor in Building #22. She and Keiko are good friends. She is an honor student and also has to help take care of her baby sister, but she feels stifled by her place and Keiko tries to break her out of it.
 
A boy from another classroom and neighbor in Building #3. He and Tomoo have a friendly rivalry.
 
Tomoo's classmate and neighbor, often called  because of how she takes lead in the class activities. She is not a morning person because she is part of an active online train enthusiast community.
 
Two of Setsuko's friends who the boys are enamoured with.
 
A grade six student who lives in Building #10 who is trying to become the student body president. He has a twin sister named  who is his polar opposite.
 
A girl from the nearby Narumachi Heights neighborhood who Tomoo befriends over playing soccer.
 
Hasumi's friend who tries to make Tomoo only her friend because of a misplaced jealousy from a past fight with Hasumi.
 
Kimiko's friend and classmate from Building #28. When they were in grade four, she was involved in a traffic accident that left her comatose. She often appears in spirit or in flashbacks to Kimiko and Tomoo.

Others
 
An 18-year-old girl who lives near the Edajima Apartments, but because of her difficulty in walking she does not attend school as much and has been held back two years. Regardless, she is well versed in the humanities and even some science. She communicates with Tomoo (and Keiko) by smoke signals and firecrackers whenever she needs help. She is also friends with Aoto.
 
A year three high school student who lives in Building #10. She is always studying in order to pass the graduation exam and in her free time practices with a yo-yo. She often loses her temper.
 
A college student who lives in Building #2 and works in the local convenience store Tanishi Mart. For this reason, the children of the apartment complex all affectionately call him . He will gladly perform errands for their parents. After his father died, he and his brother  inherited some money, and Hachirō decided to travel around the world, leaving Yūji by himself.
 
Yūji's boss who is a muscular bespectacled man.
 
The head of the Edajima residents' association who lives in Building #29. While he seems like a gruff old man, nagging the ladies of the community to keep things clean, he is actually very sweet towards children.
 
An 89-year-old man who lives in Building #5. He never seems to do anything.
 
Tomoo's elementary school teacher. She was apparently a wild child in junior high until her teacher made her change her ways. She often went to him for advice until he died, forcing her to try to learn how to be a better teacher on her own.
Ikue Honda's former teacher 
He was Ms. Honda's junior high teacher who helped her when she became a teacher, until he died.
 
A retired man whose first name no one is quite sure how to read, and who may once have been a judge. He lives in Building #22 and often confounds the housewives.
 
Kimiko's classmate who is quiet and clumsy. He always seems to avoid going home, making several lunches and eating out as much as possible. This is because his father is abusive and is mother is an alcoholic. The children of the Edajima Apartment Complex call him .
 
One of Kimiko's classmates who lives in Building #3. It is rumored that she has a pet anaconda because a large snake was seen following her home while she was playing the recorder once. She is part of the school's tennis club.
 
A professional baseball player who lives in the apartment complex who Tomoo and Yoshimoto look up to, as he played with Tomoo's favorite player .

Non-human characters
 
A crow that lives in the woods near the apartment complex. He seems to be able to understand human gestures and words.
 
A crow that also was interested in humanity, but gorged himself at the convenience store. He is hit by a truck and dies.

A crow that is deeply interested in human writing, particularly if the writer is bald.

A crow that managed to steal bait from one of the traps around the complex many times, until his luck ran out.

The ghost of a boy who hanged himself before taking the final examinations. Aoto encounters him, and his ghost cat who died after being abandoned and trying to eat the crows killed by the pest control, when staying at an inn before she takes her exams.

A cat who followed its owner 100 kilometers away from Hakone, only to collapse in the Edajima Apartment Complex. It prepares to die, but is saved by the apartment complex people and is ultimately reunited with its owner, only to be abandoned again, and decide to live in the apartment complex.

Fictional characters
 
The main character of Tomoo's favorite anime. In the show-within-a-show, he is a cyborg who gets into violent fights.

A clumsy crow who is Colonel Sports' sidekick.
 
A bear who follows Colonel Sports and Crow around.
 
Colonel Sports' math teacher.
 
The Colonel's mentor and godfather who actually killed the Colonel's family, leading to Paul being beheaded.

Media

Manga
Written and illustrated by Tobira Oda, the Danchi Tomoo manga began serialization in Shogakukan's Big Comic Spirits in 2003, and finished on February 4, 2019.  The chapters are collected into tankōbon volumes, which have been published under Shogakukan's Big Comics imprint, since February 28, 2004.

Anime
A cel shaded CGI anime adaptation of Danchi Tomoo, produced by NHK Enterprises and Shogakukan Music & Digital Entertainment, aired on NHK-G from April 6, 2013 to February 7, 2015 for a total of 78 episodes. The first season was aired from April 6, 2013 to February 1, 2014, while the second season was aired from April 12, 2014 to February 7, 2015. Ayumu Watanabe served as director, Takashi Yamada handled the series composition, Tomoki Hasegawa composed the music, and Man Kuwabata designed the characters.

The opening theme for the whole series is Danchi de DAN! RAN! (団地でDAN! RAN!) by Mongol800. The ending theme for episodes 1 through 20 is Start Line! (スタートライン!) by Sonar Pocket. The ending theme for episodes 21 through 39 is Super Smiler (スーパスマイラー) by LIFriends. The ending theme for episodes 40 through 52 is Akane (アカネ) by a flood of circle. The ending theme for episodes 53 through 65 is Friends! Friends! (フレンズ!フレンズ!) by Rico Sasaki. The ending theme for episodes 66 through 78 is Futari de Arukeba (ふたりで歩けば) by Masanori Shimada.

The 1st series has been released on DVD across 13 volumes by Pony Canyon. The same set of episodes are available for streaming on U-NEXT.

Episode list

References

External links
 Official anime website 
 

2004 manga
2013 anime television series debuts
Anime series based on manga
Comedy anime and manga
NHK original programming
Shogakukan franchises
Shogakukan manga
Seinen manga